Sophia Lois Suckling (12 August 1893 – 20 June 1990) was a notable New Zealand optician and family planning reformer. She was born in Sydney, New South Wales, Australia in 1893.

References

1893 births
1990 deaths
Opticians
Birth control activists
Australian emigrants to New Zealand